Toon Brusselers (7 July 1933 – 20 May 2005) was a Dutch footballer. He played in four matches for the Netherlands national football team from 1955 to 1962. He was also named in Netherlands's squad for the qualification tournament for the 1958 FIFA World Cup.

References

1933 births
2005 deaths
Dutch footballers
Netherlands international footballers
Sportspeople from Leuven
Association football midfielders
AGOVV Apeldoorn players
PSV Eindhoven players